"Upp över mina öron" is a song by Orup & Anders Glenmark, and performed by them at Melodifestivalen 1989, where it ended up second.

The song peaked at 4th position in the Svensktoppen, where it remained for four weeks.

Charts

References 

1989 songs
1989 singles
Anders Glenmark songs
Orup songs
Warner Music Group singles
Songs written by Anders Glenmark
Songs written by Orup
Swedish-language songs
Melodifestivalen songs of 1989